Wayne Ricks Fairclough (born 27 April 1968) is an English former professional footballer who played in the Football League for Chesterfield, Mansfield Town, Notts County and Scarborough.

References

1968 births
Living people
English footballers
Association football defenders
English Football League players
Notts County F.C. players
Mansfield Town F.C. players
Chesterfield F.C. players
Scarborough F.C. players
Northwich Victoria F.C. players
Grantham Town F.C. players
Ilkeston Town F.C. (1945) players
Hucknall Town F.C. players
Matlock Town F.C. players